Blade Club (Fencing) Singapore is a commercial fencing club founded 2005 by Henry Koh, an ex-National fencer of Singapore. The club teaches fencing students at all levels, from beginner to advanced fencing in group or individual lesson formats. According to the Club website, the mission of the Blade Club is to help develop fencing in Singapore, focusing on helping students to learn fencing well and to achieve success in competitive fencing. Blade Club has classes for all three weapons in fencing: foil, epee, and sabre. The Club is located along Bukit Timah Road, Singapore.

Background on fencing in Singapore 
Fencing is a small but growing sport in Singapore. The National Sport Association that helps to oversee fencing in Singapore is Fencing Singapore. Generally, fencing is in a handful of schools at all levels, including primary and secondary schools, junior colleges, polytechnics, and universities. Some country clubs in Singapore also have fencing, and other schools and organizations are known to organize limited fencing workshops once in a while.

There are about 10 commercial fencing clubs in Singapore; the clubs provide fencing coaching services to the schools and organizations as well as provide instruction to retail/private customers.

Fencing coaches 
Blade Club coaches are generally national-level athletes from Singapore, mostly coaching on a part-time basis. A handful of the coaches are full-time staff, including Olympic fencer Nontapat Panchan of Thailand (who took part in the Beijing 2008 Games), and other coaches from Europe. Including a few other local full-time coaches, the Blade Club coaching staff numbers between 10-15 (full- and part-time).

Fencing results and rankings 
Blade Club is the current winner of the Fencing Singapore Challenge Trophy/Champion's Cup, having won 3 Golds and 3 Silvers at the recent 2008 Pesta Sukan competition held in Singapore. The Trophy is awarded to the club that wins the most number of medals during the competition. The Club also won in 2007, when the Trophy was first introduced.

Blade Club fencers have made some of the top spots in the Singapore National Team. These fencers include:
 LIM Wei Wen (Men's Épée)
 TENG Nan See (Women's Épée)
 HUANG Magdalene Xin'En (Women's Épée)
 LAM Matthew Hin Yui (Men's Foil)
 NG Ruth Yi Lin (Women's Foil)
 TAY Yu Ling (Women's Foil)
 WONG Cheryl Ye Han (Women's Foil)
 SER Serene Xue Ling (Women's Foil)
 WONG Liane Ye Ying (Women's Foil)
 CHAN David Wei Ren (Men's Sabre)
 MUTHIAH Mark Dhinesh (Men's Sabre)
 TAY Noelle Li-Zhen (Women's Sabre)
 LEE Lewina Yi Chen (Women's Sabre)
 LIM Nona Yean Hong (Women's Sabre)
 LEE Ann Huimin (Women's Sabre)
 KHOO Liesl Yi Min (Women's Sabre)

References

External links 
 Blade Club Fencing Singapore The Official Blade Club Homepage

Sports clubs in Singapore
Fencing organizations
Fencing in Singapore
2005 establishments in Singapore
Sports clubs established in 2005
Fencing clubs